In telecommunication and horology, a slave clock is a clock that depends on another  clock, the master clock. Modern clocks are synchronized through the Internet or by radio time signals, to Coordinated Universal Time. UTC is based on a network of atomic clocks in many countries. For scientific purposes, precision clocks can be synchronized to within nanoseconds by dedicated satellite channels.  Slave clock synchronization is usually achieved by phase-locking the slave clock signal to a signal received from the master clock.  To adjust for the transit time of the signal from the master clock to the slave clock, the phase of the slave clocks are adjusted so that both clocks are in phase. Thus, the time markers of both clocks, at the output of the clocks, occur simultaneously.

The predecessors of atomic clocks, computer clocks, digital clocks, these electric clocks were synchronized by an electrical pulse, wired to their master clock in the same facility. Thus the terms "master" and "slave."  From the late 19th to the mid 20th centuries, electrical master/slave clock systems were installed, all clocks in a building or facility synchronized through electric wires to a central master clock. Slave clocks either kept time by themselves, and were periodically corrected by the master clock, or required impulses from the master clock. Many slave clocks of these types were in operation, most commonly in schools, offices, military bases, hospitals, railway networks, telephone exchanges and factories the world over. School bells of elementary schools, high schools, and others were able to be sychronized across an entire campus, connected to the system. In schools, the master clock was in the  principal's office, with slave units in classrooms which were in other buildings on campus. In factories, a system with a bell or horn could signal the end of a shift, lunchtime or break time. Very few relics of this electrical, analogue system operate in the 21st century. Most 21st century systems of the type are digital.

Pictures
Mechanical slave clocks from the 1950s and 1960s era.

References

External links
All about electric master and slave clocks
British GPO Clock Systems

Telecommunications equipment
Clocks
Digital electronics